The Estonia men's national volleyball team is controlled by the Estonian Volleyball Federation (Eesti Võrkpalli Liit) and represents Estonia in international volleyball competitions. The team has reached the European Championships six times (2009, 2011, 2015, 2017, 2019, 2021).

Results
 Champions   Runners up   Third place   Fourth place

European Championship

World League / Nations League

From 2018, the World League was replaced by the Nations League.

Challenger Cup

European League

Current squad
The following is the roster of Estonia men's national volleyball team for the 2021 Men's European Volleyball Championship

 Head coach:  Cédric Énard
 Assistant coach:  Loïc Geiler
 Assistant coach:  Oliver Lüütsepp
 Athletic trainer:  Andrés Eduardo Esper
 Statistic:  Alar Rikberg
 Team manager:  Robin Ristmäe

Statistics

Most games for Estonia

Players in bold are still active at club level.
All players with over 100 games are listed in the table.

Head coaches

Major NT tournaments include the Olympic Games, the World Championships and the European Championships.

References

External links
Official website 
FIVB profile

Volleyball in Estonia
National men's volleyball teams
Volleyball
Men's sport in Estonia